Archoleptonetidae is a family of spiders in the order Araneae. There are two genera and about eight described species in Archoleptonetidae. They are known from the western USA, southern Mexico, Guatemala, and Panama. This family was formerly a subfamily of Leptonetidae.

Genera
These genera and species belong to the family Archoleptonetidae:
 Genus Archoleptoneta Gertsch, 1974
 Archoleptoneta gertschi Ledford & Griswold, 2010 - United States
 Archoleptoneta schusteri Gertsch, 1974 - United States
 Genus Darkoneta Ledford & Griswold, 2010
 Darkoneta arganoi (Brignoli, 1974) - Mexico
 Darkoneta garza (Gertsch, 1974) - United States
 Darkoneta obscura (Gertsch, 1974) - Mexico
 Darkoneta quetzal Ledford & Griswold, 2010 - Guatemala
 Darkoneta reddelli Ledford & Griswold, 2010 - Mexico
 Darkoneta stridulans (Platnick, 1994) - Panama

References

Araneomorphae
Spider families